Arneytown is an unincorporated community located along Province Line Road on the border of North Hanover Township in Burlington County and Upper Freehold Township in Monmouth County of New Jersey. Province Line Road was on the boundary line between the Provinces of East Jersey and West Jersey. The area was once called Upper Freehold by 18th-century Quaker settlers. With the establishment of the first post office in 1827, it became known as Arneytown.

History
The Arneytown Tavern, also known as the Lawrie House, was built . It was recorded as a tavern in 1762 when William Lawrie deeded it to Richard Platt.

Historic district

The Arneytown Historic District is a  historic district encompassing the community. It was added to the National Register of Historic Places on December 12, 1977, for its significance in architecture and community development. The district has 12 contributing buildings, including three documented individually by the Historic American Buildings Survey: Lawrie House, Duncan Mackenzie Place, and Emley-Wilde House.

Cemetery
It was dedicated on May 30, 1986, by Governor Thomas Kean, and named after Doyle on January 3, 1989.

Gallery

See also
 National Register of Historic Places listings in Burlington County, New Jersey
 National Register of Historic Places listings in Monmouth County, New Jersey

References

External links
 
 
 
 

North Hanover Township, New Jersey
Upper Freehold Township, New Jersey
Populated places in the Pine Barrens (New Jersey)
Unincorporated communities in Burlington County, New Jersey
Unincorporated communities in Monmouth County, New Jersey
Unincorporated communities in New Jersey
Historic American Buildings Survey in New Jersey